C/2018 F4 (PanSTARRS) is a hyperbolic comet (previously classified as A/2018 F4, a hyperbolic asteroid). It was discovered on 17 March 2018 when it was beyond the orbit of Jupiter,  from the Sun. It was quite far from the Sun and turned out to simply be an asteroidal object that was discovered before cometary activity was noticeable. As perihelion (closest approach to the Sun) is inside the orbit of Jupiter, this object should become more active. In April 2018 it was determined to be a hyperbolic comet. Given that the incoming velocity was similar to that of an Oort cloud object, we can very confidently say that it is not of interstellar origin. C/2018 F4 fragmented around August 2020.

Overview 

It would be no problem to fit a parabolic orbit to the C/2018 F4 data, as used to be done for most short arc comets. The velocity of the object currently has an uncertainty of ±0.2 km/s. With a common Oort cloud velocity of roughly  when inbound 200 AU from the Sun, there is no reason to think 2018 F4 is of interstellar origin.

It will come to perihelion around 3 December 2019 when it will be 3.4 AU from the Sun.

Further observations will be necessary to determine if the orbit is hyperbolic. As a comet this object became known as C/2018 F4 (PANSTARRS).

The somewhat short observation arc of 35 days suggests that before entering the planetary region of the Solar System (epoch 1950), the comet had an orbital period on the order of a hundred thousand years.

At 200 AU from the Sun, the escape velocity from the Sun is 2.98 km/s. In the above table, the only outlier is ʻOumuamua with a confident 34-day observation arc. Comet C/2008 J4 (McNaught) has a short observation arc with large uncertainties. Comet C/1999 U2 (SOHO) has a meaningless 1-day observation arc. Comet C/2018 F4 has a common Oort cloud velocity when 200 AU from the Sun.

Notes

References

External links 

 

Hyperbolic comets
Astronomical objects discovered in 2018
Discoveries by Pan-STARRS